Jessica Crisp (born 19 September 1969) is an Australian windsurfer currently living in Sydney, Australia. She represented Australia at the 1984 Los Angeles Olympics when windsurfing was a demonstration sport. In 1993 and 1994 she won the Professional Windsurfers Association world title. She then represented Australia at the 2000 Sydney, 2004 Athens, 2008 Beijing and 2012 London Olympic Games. She is an Australian Institute of Sport scholarship holder.

References

External links 
 

1969 births
Living people
Australian female sailors (sport)
Australian windsurfers
Female windsurfers
Australian sportswomen
Australian Institute of Sport sailors
Olympic sailors of Australia
Sailors at the 2000 Summer Olympics – Mistral One Design
Sailors at the 2004 Summer Olympics – Mistral One Design
Sailors at the 2008 Summer Olympics – RS:X
Sailors at the 2012 Summer Olympics – RS:X